Rule by decree is a style of governance allowing quick, unchallenged promulgation of law by a single person or group of people, usually without legislative approval. While intended to allow rapid responses to a crisis, rule by decree is easily abused and is often a key feature of dictatorships.

When a state of emergency, such as martial law, is in place, rule by decree is common. While rule by decree is easily susceptible to the whims and corruption of the person in power, it is also highly efficient: a law can take weeks or months to pass in a legislature, but can be edited quickly during ruling by decree. This is what makes it valuable in emergency situations. Thus, it is allowed by many constitutions, including the French, Argentine, Indian and Hungarian constitutions.

The expression is also sometimes used when describing actions of democratic governments that are perceived to unduly bypass scrutiny from the legislature or populace.

Prominent historical examples

Lex Titia and Second Triumvirate 
One of the first examples of rule by decree was in the ancient Roman Republic, after the assassination of Julius Caesar in 44 BC, his successor Gaius Octavian (Augustus), general Mark Antony and succeeding pontifex maximus Aemilius Lepidus seized power in the Second Triumvirate, officially recognized by the senate by the Lex Titia decree. The resolution, which gave the three 'triumvirs' authoritarian powers for five years, was enacted and reinstated consecutive in 38 BC. It finally collapsed in 33/32 BC, after the downfall of Lepidus, leading to the final Roman Republican civil war and the total collapse of republican government.

Reichstag Fire Decree of 1933 
The most prominent example in history is the Reichstag Fire Decree in Germany, passed after the Reichstag building caught fire in 1933. German Chancellor Adolf Hitler convinced President Paul von Hindenburg to invoke Article 48 of the Weimar Constitution and issue a decree suspending basic civil rights indefinitely.  As a result of this decree, German authorities were able to constitutionally suppress or imprison their opposition, which in turn paved the way for the one-party rule of the Nazi Party. The ensuing state of exception, which suspended the Constitution without formally repealing it, lasted until the end of the Third Reich in 1945.

Indian Emergency (1975–1977)
During the Indian Emergency in 1975, Prime Minister Indira Gandhi pressured the President of India to declare a state of emergency, giving her absolute powers to rule by decree. Using these newfound powers, she nullified a regional court ruling which invalidated Gandhi's election to parliament due to fraud and banned her from participating in elections for six years. After assuming near-dictatorial powers, she arrested thousands of opposition politicians, suspended habeas corpus and clamped down on press freedoms. In 1977, she agreed to hold elections again, which she lost resoundingly. She subsequently resigned as prime minister and party leader.

Russian Constitutional Crisis (1993)
From 23 September (given actual effect from 4 October after the armed disbanding of the Supreme Soviet) to 12 December 1993, rule by decree (ukase) was imposed in Russia by President Boris Yeltsin, during transition from the Russian Constitution of 1978 (which was modelled after the obsolete Soviet Constitution of 1977) to the current 1993 Constitution.

Venezuela (2000–)
Venezuelan President Hugo Chávez was granted executive power by the National Assembly to rule by decree multiple times throughout his tenure, passing hundreds of laws. Chávez ruled Venezuela by decree in 2000, 2001, 2004, 2005, 2006, 2007, 2008, 2010, 2011 and 2012. Between 2004 and 2006 alone, Chávez declared 18 "emergencies" to rule by decree.

Chávez's successor, Nicolás Maduro, has also ruled by decree multiple times since he was elected in April 2013. President Maduro has ruled Venezuela by decree for the majority of the period from 19 November 2013 through 2018.

Legal situation 
Some democracies, such as Mexico, France and Argentina, permit presidential rule by decree in time of a national emergency, subject to constitutional and other legal limitations. In France, this power has been used only once, by Charles de Gaulle in 1961 during the Algerian War.

Other modern political concepts, such as the French decrees, Orders in Council in the British Commonwealth, and executive orders in the United States are partially based on this notion of decrees, although they are far more limited in scope and generally subject to judicial review.

Ireland's Emergency Powers Act allows the government to rule by decrees called Emergency Powers Orders in any aspect of national life, if the parliament invokes the emergency clause in Article 28(3) of the Constitution.  The Act however allows the Dáil Éireann to void specific EPOs in a free vote or end the state of emergency at any time.

Giorgio Agamben's critique of the use of decrees-law
Italian philosopher Giorgio Agamben has claimed that there has been an explosion in the use of various types of decrees (decree-law, presidential decrees, executive orders, etc.) since World War I. According to him, this is the sign of a "generalization of the state of exception".

See also
 Enabling act
 Carlos Ibáñez del Campo's rule in Chile during the Presidential Republic era
 Executive order
 State of emergency
 Decree
 COVID-19 pandemic in Hungary

References

Emergency laws
Dictatorship
National security
Philosophy of law
Political concepts
Totalitarianism
Decrees